This is a list of qualifying teams for the 2012 NCAA Division III men's basketball tournament. A total of 62 teams entered the tournament. Forty-one of the teams earned automatic bids by winning their conference tournaments. The automatic bid of the University Athletic Association, which does not conduct a postseason tournament, went to its regular season champion. The remaining twenty teams were granted at-large bids, which are extended by the NCAA Selection Committee.

Qualifying teams

Automatic bids
Automatic bids to the tournament were granted for winning a conference championship tournament, except for the automatic bid of the University Athletic Association given to the regular season champion. Seeds listed were seeds within the conference tournaments. Runners-up in bold face were given at-large berths.

At-large Bids

Conferences with multiple bids

All other conferences have only one bid (see Automatic Bids)
NOTE: Teams in bold represent the conference's automatic bid.

Bids by state 

NCAA Division III men's basketball tournament: qualifying teams 
NCAA Division III men's basketball tournament